Brig Sant Singh (1921-2015), whom the freedom fighters in 1971 fondly called “Brigadier Babaji” because of his attire – typical Sikh turban and beard and affectionate attitude, was an officer in the Indian Army. He was one of the six officers of the Indian Army to have been twice decorated with the Maha Vir Chakra, India's second highest war time military decoration. He was one of the Indian officers involved in training the Mukti Bahini, during the Indo-Pakistani War of 1971 and Bangladesh Liberation War.

Early life
Sant Singh was born on 12 July 1921 in Panjgrain Kalan in Faridkot, Punjab. He studied in Brijendra High School, Faridkot and RSD College, Ferozpur. He has a daughter Satinder Kaur married to Brigadier Sarabjeet Randhawa(Retired)

Military career
Singh was commissioned into the Sikh Light Infantry on 16 February 1947 on a short-service commission, receiving a regular commission in the Indian Army as a lieutenant on 15 August 1951. He took over as the commander of the Sikh Light Infantry in 1964 and led the regiment to victory in the Battle of OP Hill in the Indo-Pakistani War of 1965. He remained as the commander of the regiment till 1968. He was promoted to acting brigadier and given command of an infantry brigade on 28 August 1969. He was also instrumental in training the guerrilla forces of the Mukti Bahini and his brigade marched into Dhaka, after catching the Pakistani forces off guard, and thereby forcing the enemy to surrender. 
On 10 March 1972, Singh was given command of an infantry brigade. He retired on 12 July 1973 after 26 years of service.

Dates of rank

Notes

References 

1921 births
2015 deaths
Military personnel from Punjab, India
20th-century Indian military personnel
Recipients of the Maha Vir Chakra
Indian Sikhs